Elections for the members of the House of Representatives were held on June 5, 1928 pursuant to the Philippine Organic Act of 1902 which prescribed elections for every three years. The ruling Nacionalista Consolidado retained their majority in the House of Representatives.

Results
{| width=69% 
|-
|+ ↓
|-align=center
|
|-
|

References

  

1928
History of the Philippines (1898–1946)
1928 elections in Asia
1928 in the Philippines